Namingha is a surname. Notable people with the surname include:

Dan Namingha (born 1950), Native American painter and sculptor
Priscilla Namingha (1924–2008), Native American potter